State Route 524 (SR 524) is a state highway in eastern Ohio.

Route description
SR 524 begins at an intersection with SR 164 in the northernmost section of Bergholz, a village in northwestern Jefferson County. For most of the route's length, it parallels the Upper North Fork of Yellow Creek, an Ohi-Rail Corporation rail line, and a 345-kilovolt power line. From the southern terminus, the route heads north-northwest through a valley formed by the creek. Through Jefferson County, it passes through Bergholz and Springfield Township. After entering Carroll County, it briefly clips Lee Township and enters Fox Township. While still closely following the creek and railroad, the route passes through the community of Wattsville. As the route nears Mechanicstown, SR 524 curves to the north and separates from the creek and railroad. At Mechanicstown, the route ends at SR 39 at a stop-controlled intersection; Apollo Road (Carroll County Route 12) continues north through the intersection.

History
SR 524 was first designated in 1947 on the same Bergholz–Mechanicstown route it follows today. At the time, the route was wholly a gravel road. By 1958, the route became fully asphalt-paved.

Major intersections

References

External links

524
Transportation in Jefferson County, Ohio
Transportation in Carroll County, Ohio